Uble, also referred to as Ubli, is a small coastal village in southern Croatia. It is located on the island of Lastovo in Dubrovnik-Neretva County.

The single nave Christian basilica built between 5th-6th century was dedicated to St. Peter. It represented the urban centre of the continuously growing and prospering ancient settlement near the natural port in Ubli on the Island of Lastovo. After archaeological research work, the basilica was conserved and classified as a monument of the highest category.

Gallery

References

Lastovo
Populated coastal places in Croatia
Populated places in Dubrovnik-Neretva County